The Soana is a small  torrent of the Province of Turin, Piedmont in north-west Italy, draining a basin of some . Its headwaters are above Pianprato, in Valprato Soana, where a number of smaller torrents converge. It is the principal tributary of the Orco, which it joins at Pont Canavese.

References

External links 
 http://www.fiumi.com/acque/index.php?id_g=3024
 http://www.okadventure.it/soana.htm
 Bacino idrografico del Torrente Orco: analisi integrata evento-fenomeno-danno

Rivers of the Province of Turin
Canavese
Rivers of Italy
Rivers of the Alps